The 2001–02 season was Sepahan's 1st season in the 1st Pro League, and their 19nd consecutive season in the top division of Iranian Football and 65nd year in existence as a football club. They competed in the Hazfi Cup.

Matches

Pro league

League table

Results summary

Results by round

Matches

Hazfi Cup

Bracket

Matches

References

External links
  Club Official Website
  The Club page in Soccerway.com
  The Club page in Persianleague.com

 
Sepahan